The 2023 FC Dallas season will be the Major League Soccer club's 28th season and second under head coach Nico Estévez. FC Dallas will also be participating in the third edition of the Major League Soccer and Liga MX Leagues Cup tournament as well as the 108th edition of the U.S. Open Cup.

Background

Transfers

In 

|}

Draft picks

Out 

|}

Club

Roster 
As of March 17, 2023.

Out on loan

Competitions

Preseason

MLS

Western Conference standings 
Western Conference

Overall standings

Results summary

Results by round

Regular season 
Kickoff times are in CDT (UTC-05) unless shown otherwise

Leagues Cup

South 4

Statistics

Appearances 
Numbers outside parentheses denote appearances as starter.
Numbers in parentheses denote appearances as substitute.
Players with no appearances are not included in the list.

''

Goals and assists

Disciplinary record

Goalkeeper stats

Kits

References

FC Dallas seasons
2023 in sports in Texas
2023 Major League Soccer season